John Gargan (8 November 1918 – 1991) was an Irish hurler who played as a left wing-forward for the Kilkenny and Dublin senior teams.

Gargan made his first appearance for the Kilkenny team during the 1939 championship and was a regular on the inter-county scene until his retirement from Dublin after the 1947 championship. During that time he won one All-Ireland medal and four Leinster medals.

At club level Gargan enjoyed successful spells with Éire Óg and Faughs.

Gargan's father, Matt, won six All-Ireland medals with Kilkenny between 1907 and 1913, while his nephew, Frank Cogan, won an All-Ireland medal in football with Cork in 1973.

References

1918 births
1991 deaths
Éire Óg (Kilkenny) hurlers
Faughs hurlers
Kilkenny inter-county hurlers
Dublin inter-county hurlers
All-Ireland Senior Hurling Championship winners